Vlaho is a Croatian masculine given name, cognate to Blaise. It is common in the Dubrovnik area because of the patron saint of the city is Sveti Vlaho (St. Blaise).

Notable people with the name include:

 Vlaho Bukovac (1855–1922), Croatian painter and academic
 Vlaho Getaldić (1788–1872), Ragusan writer, translator and politician
 Vlaho Kabužić (1698–1750), Ragusan nobleman and diplomat
 Vlaho Paljetak (1893–1944), Croatian composer

See also
 Blaž (given name)

Croatian masculine given names